Luxembourg participated at the 2018 Summer Youth Olympics in Buenos Aires, Argentina from 6 October to 18 October 2018.

Athletics

Cycling

Luxembourg qualified a boys' and girls' combined team based on its ranking in the Youth Olympic Games Junior Nation Rankings.

 Boys' combined team - 1 team of 2 athletes
 Girls' combined team - 1 team of 2 athletes

Swimming

Tennis

Singles

Doubles

Triathlon

Luxembourg qualified one athlete based on its performance at the 2018 European Youth Olympic Games Qualifier.

Individual

Relay

References

2018 in Luxembourgian sport
Nations at the 2018 Summer Youth Olympics
Luxembourg at the Youth Olympics